TV1, TV One or TVOne may refer to the following television networks and channels:

 TV1 (Australian TV channel)
 TV1 (Bosnia and Herzegovina), now O Kanal
 TV1 (Canadian TV channel)
 TVOne Cyprus, now Omega
 TV1 (Estonian TV channel)
 TV1 (India), replaced by Jai Telangana TV
 TV1 (Lithuania)
 TV1 (Malaysian TV network)
 TV1 (Tanzanian TV channel)
 TV One (American TV channel)
 TV One (Sri Lankan TV channel)
 tvOne (Indonesian TV network)
 TVOne Canada, a former Urdu language channel
 TV One Pakistan
 Norsk TV1, Norway
 Yle TV1, Finland
 One (Australian TV channel), now 10 Bold
 One (Canadian TV channel)
 One (German TV channel)
 One (Maltese TV channel)
 Eén, formerly VRT TV1, Belgium
 SABC 3, formerly TV1, South Africa
 SVT1, formerly TV1, Sweden
 TRT 1, Turkey
 TVNZ 1, formerly TV One, New Zealand

See also
1TV (disambiguation)
Channel 1 (disambiguation)